Latin philosophy is philosophy in the Latin language, or from the Latin West, which may include:
Ancient Roman philosophy, by citizens of ancient Rome, sometimes in Greek and sometimes in Latin
Christian philosophy and Catholic theology by members of the Latin Church, historically mostly in Latin
Medieval philosophy in the Latin West
Latin translations of the 12th century, mostly from Arabic
Scholasticism, the dominant philosophical school in Latin universities, following these translations
Renaissance philosophy in the Latin West, inspired by translations from Greek, increasingly done also in vernaculars
Protestant theology, arising from and against Catholic theology in the Latin West
Early modern philosophy in the Latin West, in which religious denomination and the Latin language lose centrality

It could also refer to philosophy in the Romance languages (vernaculars of Latin), or from the Romance-speaking world, such as:
French philosophy
Italian philosophy
Romanian philosophy
Spanish philosophy and Portuguese philosophy
Latin American philosophy, done by inhabitants of Latin America, also in Spanish and Portuguese

See also 

 Latin literature
 History of Latin
 Arabic philosophy
 Greek philosophy
 Hebrew philosophy
 Sanskrit philosophy